AKM Sadeq (10 August 1928 – 15 June 2016) was a Bangladeshi judge who was a judge of the Bangladesh Supreme Court and the sixth Chief Election Commissioner of Bangladesh.

Early life 
AKM Sadeq was born on 10 August 1928 in Muradnagar, Comilla to a zamindar family. His father was Abu Musa Ahmed and mother was Naima Begum. He passed higher secondary from Dhaka Intermediate College. He did Honors in Economics and LLB in 2 subjects from University of Dhaka.

Career 
AKM Sadeq taught Economics and Law at University of Dhaka. After practicing law for four years, he passed the Judicial BCS and started his government service as a munsef. He then worked at the Pakistan Supreme Court in Lahore as an Assistant Registrar. After becoming Bangladesh, he served as the District Judge of Tangail. Prior to his retirement, he served as a Judge of the High Court Division.

He was appointed Chief Election Commissioner of Bangladesh on 26 April 1995 and served till 6 April 1996. The disputed election of 15 February 1996 was held under his commission। He was also a member of the Law Commission.

Death 
AKM Sadeq died on 15 June 2016 while undergoing treatment at United Hospital in Dhaka.

References 

1928 births
2016 deaths
People from Comilla District
University of Dhaka alumni
Dhaka College alumni
Chief Election Commissioners of Bangladesh
Bangladeshi judges